In geometry, the great disdyakis dodecahedron is a nonconvex isohedral polyhedron. It is the dual of the uniform great truncated cuboctahedron. It has 48 triangular faces.

Proportions
The dihedral angle equals . Part of each triangle lies within the solid, hence is invisible in solid models.

Related polyhedra
The great disdyakis dodecahedron is topologically identical to the convex Catalan solid, disdyakis dodecahedron, which is dual to the truncated cuboctahedron.

References

External links 
 

Dual uniform polyhedra